Wenceslaus III (6 October 12894 August 1306) was King of Hungary and Croatia between 1301 and 1305, and King of Bohemia and Poland from 1305. He was the son of Wenceslaus II, King of Bohemia, who was later also crowned king of Poland, and Judith of Habsburg. Still a child, Wenceslaus was betrothed to Elizabeth, the sole daughter of Andrew III of Hungary. After Andrew III's death in early 1301, the majority of the Hungarian lords and prelates elected Wenceslaus king, although Pope Boniface VIII supported another claimant, Charles Robert, a member of the royal house of the Kingdom of Naples.

Wenceslaus was crowned king of Hungary on 27 August 1301. He signed his charters under the name Ladislaus in Hungary. His rule was only nominal, because a dozen powerful lords held sway over large territories in the kingdom. His father realized that Wenceslaus's position could not be strengthened and took him back from Hungary to Bohemia in August 1304. Wenceslaus succeeded his father in Bohemia and Poland on 21 June 1305. He abandoned his claim to Hungary in favor of Otto III of Bavaria on 9 October.

Wenceslaus granted large parcels of the royal domains to his young friends in Bohemia. A local claimant to the Polish throne, Władysław the Elbow-high, who had started conquering Polish territories during the rule of Wenceslaus's father, captured Cracow in early 1306. Wenceslaus decided to invade his rival's territories in Poland, but he was murdered before starting his campaign. He was the last of the male Přemyslid rulers of Bohemia.

Childhood (1289–1301) 
He was the second son of Wenceslaus II, King of Bohemia and Wenceslaus II's wife, Judith of Habsburg. He was born in Prague on 6 October 1289. His elder brother died before his birth and he was the only son of his parents to survive infancy.

Wenceslaus was still a child when his mother, Judith, died on 18 June 1297. He was betrothed to Elizabeth of Hungary on 12 February 1298. She was the only child of Andrew III of Hungary. Andrew III was the last male member of the House of Árpád, the native royal dynasty of Hungary, but the legitimacy of his rule had not been unanimously acknowledged.

Wenceslaus's father occupied Greater Poland, Kujavia and other regions of Poland in early 1300. After his main opponent, Władysław the Elbow-high, was forced to leave the kingdom, Wenceslaus II was crowned king of Poland in Gniezno in late September 1300. However, Pope Boniface VIII refused to confirm Wenceslaus II's position in Poland.

King of Hungary and Croatia (1301–1305) 

Andrew III of Hungary died on 14 January 1301, leaving no male heirs. The late king's rival, Charles of Anjou, who was Béla IV of Hungary's great-great-grandson, had regarded himself as the lawful king of Hungary for years. On hearing Andrew III's death, Charles of Anjou hurried to Esztergom where Gregory Bicskei, Archbishop-elect of Esztergom, crowned him king. Being Pope Boniface VIII's candidate for the Hungarian throne, Charles had always been unpopular, because the Hungarian lords feared that they would "lose their freedom by accepting a king appointed by the Church", according to the Illuminated Chronicle. Charles's coronation was not performed with the Holy Crown of Hungary in Székesfehérvár, as it was required by customary law, but with a provisional crown in Esztergom. Accordingly, the Diet of Hungary declared Charles's coronation invalid on 13 May 1301.

Jan Muskata, Bishop of Cracow, who was Wenceslaus II of Bohemia's advisor, was the first to propose that Wenceslaus II's son and namesake should be elected king of Hungary. The younger Wenceslaus was not only Béla IV of Hungary's great-great-grandson, but also the fiancé of the late Andrew III of Hungary's daughter. Bribed by Wenceslaus II's agents, the majority of the Hungarian lords and prelates decided to offer the crown to the young Wenceslaus and sent a delegation to his father to Bohemia. Wenceslaus II met the Hungarian envoys in Hodonín in August and accepted their offer in his eleven-year-old son's name. Wenceslaus II accompanied his son to Székesfehérvár where John Hont-Pázmány, Archbishop of Kalocsa, crowned the young Wenceslaus king with the Holy Crown on 27 August. Wenceslaus who assumed the name Ladislaus signed all his charters under that name in Hungary.

After Wenceslaus II returned to Bohemia, Jan Muskata became the young king's principal advisor in Hungary. Most lords and prelates accepted the rule of Wenceslaus-Ladislaus. In contrast with their Hungarian peers, the Croatian lords did not acknowledge Wenceslaus-Ladislaus as a lawful king and remained faithful to Charles of Anjou. The latter withdrew to the southern territories of Hungary after Ivan Kőszegi, who was a partisan of Wenceslaus-Ladislaus, captured Esztergom in late August 1301.  However, both kings' authority remained nominal because Hungary had meanwhile disintegrated into a dozen provinces, each headed by a powerful lord, or "oligarch". The Illuminated Chronicle writes that the Hungarian lords did not "grant a castle, or might and power, or royal authority" either to Wenceslaus-Ladislaus or to Charles of Anjou.

In his letters to Wenceslaus II of Bohemia and Archbishop John of Kalocsa, Pope Boniface VIII emphasized that Wenceslaus-Ladislaus had been crowned without the authorization of the Holy See. The papal legate, Niccolo Boccasini, who came to Hungary in September, started negotiations with the Hungarian prelates to convince them to abandon Wenceslaus-Ladislaus and support Charles of Anjou's case. In an attempt to buy the most powerful lords off, Wenceslaus-Ladislaus granted large estates and high offices to them. Matthew Csák received Nyitra and Trencsén Counties, along with the royal castles and the estates attached to them, in February 1302. Ivan Kőszegi was made Palatine of Hungary before 25 April 1302. In the first half of that year, many prelates (including Stephen, the new Archbishop of Kalocsa) abandoned Wenceslaus-Ladislaus; even Jan Muskata left Hungary.

Taking advantage of the weakened position of his rival, Charles of Anjou attempted to capture Buda, the capital of Wenceslaus-Ladislaus, in September 1302. After laying siege to Buda, Charles of Anjou called upon the burghers to extradite Wenceslaus-Ladislaus. The mainly German citizentry and their major, Werner, remained faithful to the young king and Ivan Kőszegi relieved the city in the same month. After Charles of Anjou withdrew from Buda, the papal legate placed the town under interdict. In response, a local priest excommunicated the pope and all Hungarian prelates. On 31 May 1303, Pope Boniface VIII declared Charles of Anjou the lawful king of Hungary, stating that Wenceslaus-Ladislaus's election had been invalid. Thereafter Albert I of Germany, who was the maternal uncle of both Wenceslaus-Ladislaus and Charles of Anjou, called on Wenceslaus-Ladislaus to withdraw from Hungary.

To strengthen his son's position, Wenceslaus II of Bohemia came to Hungary at the head of a large army in May 1304. He captured Esztergom, but his negotiations with the local lords convinced him that his son's position in Hungary had dramatically weakened. Accordingly, he decided to take Wenceslaus-Ladislaus back to Bohemia. Wenceslaus-Ladislaus did not renounce Hungary and made Ivan Kőszegi governor before leaving for Bohemia in August. He even took the Holy Crown of Hungary with himself to Prague. Charles of Anjou and Rudolf III of Austria invaded Moravia in September, but did not defeat Wenceslaus II's army. In the same months, a member of the Piast dynasty, Władysław the Elbow-high, who had claimed Poland against Wenceslaus II, returned to Poland at the head of Hungarian troops. Before long, he captured many important forts and towns, including Pełczyska, Wiślica, Sandomierz, and Sieradz.

King of Bohemia and Poland (1305–1306) 

Wenceslaus II of Bohemia and Poland died on 21 June 1305. Wenceslaus III succeeded his father in both kingdoms, but his position in Poland was precarious because Władysław the Elbow-high continued his fight for the Polish throne. Wenceslaus realized that he could not preserve his three kingdoms and decided to renounce Hungary. However, instead of acknowledging Charles of Anjou as the lawful king of Hungary, Wenceslaus abandoned his claim to the Hungarian throne in favor of Otto III of Bavaria, who was Béla IV of Hungary's grandson. Wenceslaus handed the Holy Crown of Hungary over to Otto in Brno on 9 October 1305. In the same months, Wenceslaus, who had meanwhile broken his engagement to Elizabeth of Hungary, married Viola of Teschen upon the Bohemian lords' advice.

The sixteen-year-old Wenceslaus led a dissolute life. He was surrounded by a group of young Czech noblemen, to whom he made large land grants. His position in Poland further weakened after Władysław the Elbow-high captured Cracow in early 1306. To forge an alliance against his rival, Wenceslaus granted Gdańsk and Pomorze to Waldemar, Margrave of Brandenburg-Stendal and Herman, Margrave of Brandenburg-Salzwedel as fiefs in July 1306. After deciding to invade Poland, Wenceslaus dismissed his young favorites and made his brother-in-law, Henry of Carinthia, governor. However, before Wenceslaus could invade, he was stabbed in Olomouc on 4 August 1306. His assassin was never identified. Wenceslaus was the last king of Bohemia from the native Přemyslid dynasty.

See also

 History of Poland during the Piast dynasty
 List of people who died on the toilet
 List of unsolved murders
 Toilet-related injuries and deaths

References

Sources

Primary sources

The Hungarian Illuminated Chronicle: Chronica de Gestis Hungarorum (Edited by Dezső Dercsényi) (1970). Corvina, Taplinger Publishing. .

Secondary sources

1289 births
1306 deaths
13th-century Bohemian people
14th-century Bohemian people
14th-century monarchs in Europe
14th-century murdered monarchs
14th-century Polish monarchs
Vencel
Male murder victims
Medieval child monarchs
Venceslas
Medieval nobility of the Holy Roman Empire
Venceslas
Hungarian twins
Unsolved murders in Europe